The Antoniusstraße is one of the oldest streets of in the centre of Aachen, North Rhine-Westphalia, Germany. It is known for window prostitution.

History
There was a settlement at the location of today's road from the time of the Roman Empire. When the foundations for the "Germania Fischhallen" were dug in 1905, numerous vessels and remains of walls from Roman and medieval times were found. Excavations to reroute a sewer in 2014 found a Roman iron smelting fire-pit in the street. The street was named Hurengasse in the Middle Ages and early modern times, referring to brothels in the street during the period. The location of the "pleasure trade" in the street was probably due to its close proximity to the two spa districts on the Büchel and in Komphausbadstrasse. It was renamed to Antoniusstraße in 1872 after the City Council obtained royal approval. It is named after Saint Anthony of Padua, who campaigned for the poor and for prostitutes.

In addition to prostitution, Antoniusstraße has been home to other companies over the years. A chemical factory, set up by the pharmacist Johann Peter Joseph Monheim and operated by his son Viktor Monheim and grandson Johannes Theodor Monheim, caught fire on 29 June 1883 and triggered a large fire that also affected Aachen Town Hall. The largest Aachen company for the production of fine papers, the stationers Frehn had its headquarters at 29 Antoniusstraße until the Second World War. The Germania Fischhallen built by entrepreneur Wilhelm Frohn in 1907. The building is currently used as a restaurant.

During the Second World War, the German Labour Front was the registered of the building No. 15.

The Aachen-born former professional boxer Klaus Gallwe is the property manager of the window-houses in Antoniusstraße.

Controversy
The Antoniusstraße continues to be dominated by prostitutes offering their services from windows. Due to the location of the street in the middle of the pedestrian zone in the city centre, multiple attempts have been made to move prostitution out of the area. Access for emergency vehicles prevents privacy screens being set up at both ends of the street, such as in Hamburg 's Herbertstrasse, and there is a screen only at one end. In 2009, former Lord Mayor Jürgen Linden proposed restricting prostitutes to half of the street. This was resisted by the owners of the windows and, amongst other reasons, cited the ever decreasing crime rate in the street in recent years.

In 2010, backed by local politicians, an investor also aimed to push back the red-light district. Apart from the FDP, which wants to move the entire brothel area, there is a bipartisan agreement to leave the red light district on Antoniusstraße. In 2017, new plans were drawn up to concentrate prostitution in a newly built "Laufhaus" in the lower part of the street as part of a redevelopment of the area. The "Laufhaus" would be able to accommodate 120 prostitutes. This plan was opposed by some, including police commissioner Dirk Weinspach, who wanted to see prostitution move to the outskirts of the city.

See also
 Prostitution in Germany
 Timeline of Aachen

Notes and references

Notes

References

Bibliography

External links

 

Aachen
Streets in Germany
Red-light districts in Germany